The Journal for Healthcare Quality is a bimonthly peer-reviewed healthcare journal published by Wiley-Blackwell on behalf of the National Association for Healthcare Quality.

History 
The journal was preceded by View and Review, which was renamed in 1979 to Journal of Quality Assurance, the official journal for the National Association of Quality Assurance Professionals, whose executive director, David Stumph, was the editor-in-chief. While a few articles appeared in this journal, most of the content consisted of organizational news stories, making it more of a news magazine than an academic journal. In 1991, the journal obtained its current title, when the association changed its name to National Association for Healthcare Quality.

Abstracting and indexing 
The journal is abstracted and indexed in CINAHL and MEDLINE/PubMed.

References

External links 
 
 National Association for Healthcare Quality

Public health journals
Bimonthly journals
Wiley-Blackwell academic journals
Publications established in 1979
English-language journals